Aasgard Pass, officially identified as Colchuck Pass, (elevation ) is a mountain pass on the east side of the Cascades in Washington's Alpine Lakes Wilderness southwest of Leavenworth.  It is the shorter and steeper of two primary hiking routes into the Enchantments, one of Washington's most popular hiking areas.  It separates Colchuck Lake (elevation ) to the northwest from the Upper Enchantment Basin (elevation ~) to the southeast.  Aasgard Pass is located at the saddle between Dragontail Peak and the Enchantment Peaks.

Attempts to change the name officially in 1967 and 1988 were both turned down by the US Board on Geographic Names; thus, the name "Colchuck Pass" is retained on United States Geological Survey (USGS) maps.  Mountaineers have long referred to the feature as Aasgard Pass, the name favored by famed climber and guide author Fred Beckey.   The name was likely coined by Bill and Peggy Stark, who explored the Enchantments extensively in the mid-20th Century, and who gave Nordic mythological names to many of the lakes that previously had been named by A. H. Sylvester, a U.S. Geological Survey topographer supervisor of Wenatchee National Forest in the early 1900s who is credited with discovering the region.   The official naming rulings of the US Board in the 1960s resulted in a mixture of the two name sets being adopted as official. The current policy of not adopting new names for geographic features in wilderness areas probably precludes the rest of the names identified by the Starks from ever achieving official status.

Deaths and Accidents 

In May 1998, Steve Smith was glissading down Aasgard Pass when he fell 30 feet into a waterfall. He survived the incident and now he's Climbing Education Manager with The Mountaineers.

On August 6, 2010, a 52-year-old man was hiking and glissading with his son when he slipped and fell about 15 feet into a waterfall on Aasgard Pass. Stephen Grate led hikes in the Renton and Issaquah areas to teach the history of coal mining.

On July 3, 2011, a 21-year-old student at Pacific Lutheran University named Julia A. Rutherford was glissading down Aasgard Pass with a group when she slipped and fell into a crevasse and into running glacial water. Officials say the woman fell in around 10:30am and because of the freezing temperatures of the water likely did not survive over 20 minutes.

On June 5, 2016, a 24-year-old man named Qi He fell into a waterfall hole and died. Due to the snowpack, rescuers could not retrieve his body until a month after the accident. His family has asked local authorities to post warning signs at Colchuck Lake and the Enchantments trailhead to prevent future accidents.

On June 5, 2017, a 19-year-old man named Benjamin Gore from Mercer Island was presumed dead after glissading into the same waterfall hole around 5 PM. His body was recovered on June 25, 2017, due to deep snow and fast-running water.

On Sept 28, 2022 a 41-year-old man named Swaminathan Sundaram of Remond died of natural causes while hiking.

In an unusual story of survival, in May 1998, Steve Smith, a mountain climber early in his climbing career, slipped into the same waterfall hole at Aasgard Pass. Steve managed to use his bare hands to tunnel his way back out and has documented his experience online at The Mountaineers' blog, several TV news interviews, and The Sharp End Podcast (episode 25) for others to learn about.

References

External links

Mountain passes of Chelan County, Washington
Mountain passes of Washington (state)
Mountain passes of the Cascades
Wenatchee National Forest